Fred P. Schlichter was American football player and coach. He served as the head football coach at Rollins College in Winter Park, Florida in 1921. Schlichter played college football at Cornell University in Ithaca, New York.

References

Year of birth missing
Year of death missing
American football fullbacks
Cornell Big Red football players
Rollins Tars football coaches